Hechuan may refer to these places in China:

Hechuan District (合川区), Chongqing
Hechuan Township (河川乡), in Guyuan, Ningxia

Towns
Hechuan, Jiangxi (禾川), in Yongxin County, Jiangxi
Hechuan, Shanxi (和川), in Anze County, Shanxi